San Marino participated at the inaugural edition of the European Games in 2015.

Medal Tables

Medals by Games

Medals by sports

List of medallists

See also
 San Marino at the Olympics

References